Chitranjan Singh Ranawat is an American orthopedic surgeon of Indian origin.

Ranawat was born in Sarwania, in the Indian state of Madhya Pradesh and did his early medical education at Mahatma Gandhi Memorial Medical College, Indore and his schooling from The Daly College, Indore before moving to the US for advanced training. There, he worked at St. Peters Hospital, Albany and Albany Medical Center and received certification as an orthopedic surgeon by the American Board of Orthopedic Surgery in 1969. Later, he moved to Lenox Hill Hospital where he became the chairman and director of the Orthopedic department. He has also served as a professor at the Weill Medical College of Cornell University and as a visiting faculty at other universities. Ranawat and Albert Burstein of the Hospital for Special Surgery, also in New York City, invented a hip replacement implant marketed by Biomet.

In 1986 he founded the Ranawat Foundation, a philanthropic organization. and in 2001 he received the Padma Bhushan, the third highest Indian civilian award.  Each year at its annual meeting, the Knee Society presents the "Chitranjan S. Ranawat, MD Award" and two other awards for the best research papers that year.

Writings

See also

 Joint replacement
 Arthroplasty

References

Recipients of the Padma Bhushan in medicine
Year of birth missing (living people)
People from Madhya Pradesh
American orthopedic surgeons
Albany Medical College faculty
Cornell University faculty
American medical academics
American medical writers
Living people
Indian emigrants to the United States